Praseodymium iodide may refer to:

 Praseodymium diiodide, PrI2
 Praseodymium(III) iodide (praseodymium triiodide), PrI3